Colin Wallace is a psychological warfare specialist.

Colin Wallace may also refer to:

Colin Wallace (cricketer)
Colin Wallace, character in The Last Train (TV series)